Conus rouxi is a species of sea snail, a marine gastropod mollusk in the family Conidae, the cone snails, cone shells or cones.

These snails are predatory and venomous. They are capable of "stinging" humans.

Description
The size of the shell varies between 32 mm and 53 mm.

Distribution
This marine species off Northwest Australia.

References

 Eric Monnier, Loïc Limpalaër & Alain Robin (2013), Description of three new species: P. koukae n. sp. from Oman, P. arafurensis n. sp. from Northern Australia and P. rouxi n. sp. from Western Australia; Xenophora Taxonomy N° 1 – Supplément au Xenophora n° 144 – Octobre 2013
 Puillandre N., Duda T.F., Meyer C., Olivera B.M. & Bouchet P. (2015). One, four or 100 genera? A new classification of the cone snails. Journal of Molluscan Studies. 81: 1–23

External links
 To World Register of Marine Species
 

rouxi
Gastropods of Australia
Gastropods described in 2013